Eupatorium mohrii, commonly called Mohr's thoroughwort, is a herbaceous perennial plant in the family Asteraceae native to the southeastern and south-central states of the United States, in the coastal plain from Virginia to Texas.  It has also been found in the Dominican Republic.

Eupatorium mohrii is a perennial herb up to 100 cm (40 inches) tall and are producing tuberous rhizomes.  As with other species of Eupatorium, the inflorescences contain a large number of tiny white flower heads, each with 5 disc florets but no ray florets.  It forms hybrids with Eupatorium serotinum and Eupatorium rotundifolium.

Eupatorium mohrii grows in moist areas, edges of ponds, and sandy soils.

References

mohrii
Flora of the Dominican Republic
Flora of the Southern United States
Plants described in 1901